Loxton High School is a co-educational secondary school (Years 7 to 12) with a current enrolment of 620 students in Loxton, South Australia.

Loxton High has a predominantly maroon or white uniform with yellow and blue trim.  Sporting teams wear maroon and yellow with blue trim. The school does not currently have a mascot or sporting nickname.

History
Opened in 1959, the school was originally known as the Loxton Area High School, but it did not take long before the name was shortened. Favouring academics and athleticism, in 1979 Loxton High commenced its record breaking run at the annual Riverland Interschool Athletics Carnival, and to date has not been beaten for the championship shield since. The school underwent a major re-development between 2001 and 2007 with the completion of the new administration building, science laboratories, technology workshops and gymnasium.

Sport

The school currently competes competitively in Athletics, Triathlon, Cross Country, Swimming, Pedal Prix and Volleyball. Loxton High is currently ranked as the top triathlon school in the state, the second best athletics school, and the third best volleyball school (2012).

Musical Productions

References 

High schools in South Australia